Nikita Naumov (born 15 November 1989) is a Belarusian footballer playing currently for Kyzylzhar.

International career

International goals
Scores and results list Belarus' goal tally first.

Honours
Naftan Novopolotsk
Belarusian Cup winner: 2011–12

References

External links
 
 

1989 births
Living people
Sportspeople from Vitebsk
Belarusian footballers
Association football defenders
Belarus international footballers
Belarusian expatriate footballers
Expatriate footballers in Kazakhstan
FC Naftan Novopolotsk players
FC Polotsk players
FC Vitebsk players
FC Zhetysu players
FC Dinamo Minsk players
FC Kyzylzhar players